Robert Paul Abelson (September 12, 1928 – July 13, 2005) was a Yale University psychologist and political scientist with special interests in statistics and logic.

Biography
He was born in New York City and attended the Bronx High School of Science. He did his undergraduate work at MIT and his Ph.D. in psychology at Princeton University's Department of Psychology under John Tukey and Silvan Tomkins.

From Princeton, Abelson went to Yale, where he stayed for the subsequent five decades of his career. Arriving during the Yale Communication Project, Abelson contributed to the foundation of attitudes studies as co-author of Attitude Organization and Change: An Analysis of Consistency Among Attitude Component, (1960, with Rosenberg, Hovland, McGuire, & Brehm).  While at Yale, Abelson was briefly a bass in the Yale Russian Chorus.

With Milton J. Rosenberg, he developed the notion of “symbolic psycho-logic," an early attempt, using an idiosyncratic kind of adjacency matrix of a signed graph, at a descriptive (rather than prescriptive) psychological organization of attitudes and attitude consistency, which was key to the development of the field of social cognition.

The notion that beliefs, attitudes, and ideology were deeply connected knowledge structures was contained in Scripts, Plans, Goals, and Understanding (1977, with Roger Schank), a work that has collected several thousand citations, and led to the first interdisciplinary graduate program in cognitive science at Yale. His work on voting behavior in the 1960 and 1964 elections, and the creation of a computer program modeling ideology (the “Goldwater machine”) helped define and build the field of political psychology.

He was the author of Statistics As Principled Argument which includes prescriptions for how statistical analyses should proceed, as well as a description of what statistical analysis is, why we should do it, and how to differentiate good from bad statistical arguments. He was a co-author of several other books in psychology, statistics, and political science.
In 1959, Abelson published a paper to elucidate different ways in which an individual tends to resolve his "belief dilemmas" (Abelson «Modes of  Resolution of Belief Dilemmas» Journal of conflict Resolution 1959). 
 
Abelson received the Distinguished Scientific Contribution Award from APA, the Distinguished Scientist Award from SESP, and the Distinguished Scientist Award from the International Society of Political Psychology. He was elected a Fellow of the American Academy of Arts and Sciences in 1978.

He died of complications of Parkinson's disease.

Books

See also
 The MAGIC criteria
 Abelson's paradox

Bibliography

 Ira J. Roseman, Stephen J. Read, "Psychologist at Play:  Robert P. Abelson's Life and Contributions to Psychological Science",  Perspectives on Psychological Science 2:1:86-97 (March 2007)

References

American political scientists
American social psychologists
Massachusetts Institute of Technology alumni
Princeton University alumni
Yale University faculty
1928 births
2005 deaths
Deaths from Parkinson's disease
Neurological disease deaths in the United States
Fellows of the American Statistical Association
Fellows of the American Academy of Arts and Sciences
The Bronx High School of Science alumni
20th-century political scientists